Everything Went Fine is a 2021 French drama film and written by François Ozon, based on the novel Everything Went Well by Emmanuèle Bernheim. It stars Sophie Marceau, André Dussollier, Géraldine Pailhas, Charlotte Rampling, Hanna Schygulla, Éric Caravaca and Grégory Gadebois.

The film had its world premiere at the Cannes Film Festival on 7 July 2021. It was released in France on 22 September 2021 by Diaphana Distribution.

Plot
From François Ozon (8 Women, Swimming Pool) comes a powerful family drama in which a daughter is forced to reconcile with her father and their shared past after he contacts her with a devastating final wish. When André (André Dussollier) suffers a debilitating stroke and calls on his daughter Emmanuèle (Sophie Marceau) to help him die with dignity, she finds herself faced with a painful decision. Based on Emmanuèle Bernheim’s memoir and an Official Selection of the Cannes Film Festival, Everything Went Fine’s matter-of-factness elicits moments of humor that renders an otherwise weighty topic accessible. Steering clear of the moral arguments such issues often raise, the film instead focuses on the reckoning Emmanuéle has with her stubborn and unrelenting father and how to help him, with Ozon tackling a difficult subject with exceptional intelligence and sensitivity. Featuring stunning central performances by Marceau and Dussollier as well as a scene-stealing cameo by Charlotte Rampling as André’s ex-wife.

Cast
 Sophie Marceau as Emmanuèle 
 André Dussollier as André
 Géraldine Pailhas as Pascale
 Charlotte Rampling as Claude
 Hanna Schygulla 
 Éric Caravaca
 Grégory Gadebois as Gérard
 Jacques Nolot
 Laëtitia Clément

Production
In March 2020, it was announced Sophie Marceau, André Dussollier and Laëtitia Clément had joined the cast of the film, with François Ozon directing from a screenplay he wrote, based upon the novel Everything Went Well by Emmanuèle Bernheim. Principal photography began in late 2020.

Release
The film had its world premiere at the Cannes Film Festival on 7 July 2021. Shortly after, Cohen Media Group and Curzon Artificial Eye acquired U.S. and U.K. distribution rights to the film. It was released in France on 22 September 2021 by Diaphana Distribution. Cohen Media Group, the US distributors of the film, will release Everything Went Fine in the United States on April 14, 2023.

Critical reception
On review aggregator website Rotten Tomatoes, the film holds an approval rating of 92% based on 13 reviews, with an average rating of 6.5/10.

References

External links
 
 

2021 films
2021 drama films
2021 LGBT-related films
2020s French films
2020s French-language films
Films about euthanasia
Films about father–daughter relationships
Films based on French novels
Films directed by François Ozon
Films with screenplays by François Ozon
France 2 Cinéma films
French drama films
French LGBT-related films
LGBT-related drama films